The MV Orient Princess is a 1967 built passenger ship, originally built as the Yaohua. She was the first purpose built passenger ship for the People’s Republic of China, as well as their first flagship.

History
Orient Princess was delivered as Yaohua to the China Ocean Shipping Company, who had her first operate from China to East Africa. She would later sail in the Far East. Yaohua had a larger swimming pool then most ships of her size.

In 1982 the vessel was chartered to Salén Lindblad Cruises, a move that allowed the ship to become more popular. Salén Lindblad operated her under the name China Cruises beginning in March 1983, having her cruise through the Yangtze River and along the Chinese coast. These cruises would begin in either Beijing or Hong Kong. In 1987 she was purchased and renamed Orient Princess. Throughout the 1990s the Orient Princess would change ownership and roles several times, once operating as a casino ship.

Current situation
Orient Princess was seized by authorities in April 2003 due to her underpaid crew. She was taken over by another Chinese company, who moored her in Tianjin as a floating tourist attraction. Two large restaurants were built atop Orient Princess, one being placed aft of the boat deck superstructure, the other on her promenade deck. As of 2010 not much else is known of the ship's current status. The ship can currently be seen via satellite on the North Bank of the Haihe River

References

1966 ships
Passenger ships of China
Ships built by Chantiers de l'Atlantique